PureWave Networks was a developer of advanced,  4G LTE and WiMAX base stations. Based in Santa Clara, California, PureWave Networks is a privately held company that was founded in 2003. The company was backed by Silicon Valley venture firms including Allegis Capital, Benahmou Global Ventures, ATA Ventures, Core Capital and Leapfrog Ventures. PureWave's line of Mobile WiMAX 802.16e base stations were sold in a variety of licensed frequencies. In 2014, Purewave's Quantum WiMAX product line was acquired by one of its customers, Mercury Networks and the remaining company assets were sold to Redline Communications for a cash purchase price of US$2 million.

History 
Established in 2003, PureWave specializes in developing high-performance, compact, outdoor base stations for 4G wireless networks.  In 2009 PureWave introduced the PureWave Quantum family of mobile WiMAX base stations with the PureWave Quantum 1000. It was followed in 2010 and 2011 by PureWave Quantum 6600 and PureWave Quantum 2200, respectively. PureWave uses an open product architecture that allows operators to build their networks using equipment from multiple vendors, utilizing any end user device that conforms to the 802.16e standard. PureWave is developing a portfolio of 4G LTE small cell base stations that will support both TD-LTE and FDD-LTE. In 2012 the company relocated its headquarters from Mountain View, CA to Santa Clara, CA.

Products and Technology

PureWave Quantum Base Stations 
The PureWave Quantum family of products consists of two product lines: PureWave Quantum 2200 and PureWave Quantum 6600.  Both product lines can be deployed outdoors, and share the same enclosure, software code and functionality.

LTE Base Stations 
PureWave is currently developing a portfolio of small cell 4G LTE base stations.

Current Deployments 
The following is a selection of customers and deployments publicly announced by PureWave:
See also list of deployed WiMAX networks 
 Mercury Wireless, covering 4000 square miles of rural Kansas 
 AireArk - 15,000 business and residential customers in Arkansas 
 EMAXX Telecom, the operator has announced plans to serve 150,000 customers across Cambodia 
 Scarlet, 8,000 customers in Aruba, St. Maarten and Curaçao 
 City of Chanute, Kansas, Smart Grid Deployment, 5,400 electric and 4,400 gas and water customers, city-owned utility, Southeast Kansas 
 Cal-Ore, covering 200 square miles, rural California and Oregon

Awards 
 WISPA Product of the Year Award, 2011, PureWave Quantum 6600 
 4GWE Product of the Year Award, 2009: PureWave Quantum

Management   
 Don Meiners, CEO
 Peter Carson, Senior VP of Worldwide Sales
 Dan Picker, CTO
 Ronen Vengosh, VP of Marketing and Business Development
 Reza Golshan, VP of Engineering
 Tom Scannell, CFO

References 

Electronics companies of the United States
Companies based in Santa Clara, California